This is a list of players that participated in the women's wheelchair basketball competition at the 2020 Summer Paralympics.

Group A

Group B

References

Women's team rosters
2021 in women's basketball
2020